Surat  is a rural town and locality in the Maranoa Region, Queensland, Australia.

Geography

There are oil fields further south.

History
Mandandanji (also known as Mandandanyi, Mandandanjdji, Kogai) is an Australian Aboriginal language spoken by the Mandandanji people. The Mandandanji language region includes the landscape within the local government boundaries of the Maranoa Regional Council, particularly Roma, Yuleba and Surat, then east towards Chinchilla and south-west towards Mitchell and St George.

The district was first mapped by New South Wales Surveyor-General Sir Thomas Mitchell in 1846. By the end of the 1840s pastoralists had penetrated the area, and in 1849 Mitchell directed surveyor Edward Lewis Burrowes to select a township site on the Balonne River. Burrowes did so and named it after the diamond-polishing city of Surat, after his former place of residence in present-day Gujarat state, then known as the Bombay Province, India.

Surat State School opened on 23 July 1874.

Facilities

Maranoa Regional Council operates a public library at 62 Burrowes Street, within the Cobb & Co. Changing Station complex. The public library opened in 1997 and has publicly accessible Wi-Fi.  The complex also has a Cobb & Co changing station, freshwater aquarium, social history museum, theatre and shire hall and the Balonne gallery.

Education 
Surat State School is a government primary and secondary (Prep-10) school for boys and girls at 55 Robert Street. In 2017, the school had an enrolment of 87 students with 14 teachers (12 full-time equivalent) and 10 non-teaching staff (8 full-time equivalent).

Media 
Along with a number of other regional Australian newspapers owned by NewsCorp, the Surat Basin News newspaper ceased publication in June 2020.

Heritage listings

Surat has a number of heritage-listed sites, including:
 77 Burrowes Street: Astor Theatre
 corner Cordelia & William Streets: Warroo Shire Hall

References

External links

 
 Town map of Surat, 1982
Maranoa Online A portal servicing the Maranoa - a region encompassing Surat.

Towns in Queensland
Maranoa Region
Populated places established in 1849
1849 establishments in Australia
Localities in Queensland